The Ministry of Finance and Economic Planning is the government ministry responsible for the economic and monetary health of Ghana.  The Ministry is involved with economic planning, fiscal policy, national accounting, the national budget, and creating an environment for investment and growth.

The main offices of the Ministry are located in Accra.

History 
Komla Agbeli Gbedemah was the first Finance Minister of independent Ghana under Kwame Nkrumah  between 1954 and 1961.

Departments and agencies
The following are government agencies of the Ministry:
Securities and Exchange Commission
Institute of Accountancy Training
Internal Revenue Service (IRS)
Value Added Tax  Service (VATs)
Customs, Excise and Preventive Service (CEPS)

The Ministry has the oversight responsibilities with regard to:
Bank of Ghana (BOG)
National Lotteries Authority (NLA)
Public Procurement Board (PPB)
Ghana Cocoa Board (GCB)
Revenue Agencies Governing Board (RAGB)

Divisions under the ministry include:
 Advisor(s)
 Budget
 Debt Management
 Economic Research & Forecasting
 External Economic Relations
 Financial Sector
 General Administration
 Information and Communication Technology (ICT) Directorate
 Internal Audit
 Legal
 Public Investment
 Real Sector

List of Ministers 
The first Ghanaian to head this ministry is Komla Agbeli Gbedemah who assumed this position in 1954 when the Britain allowed Kwame Nkrumah to form a government prior to gaining full independence in 1957. The Ministry has at various times been designated as Ministry of Finance or as it is currently, the Ministry of Finance and Economic Planning.

See also
Economy of Ghana
Government of Ghana

References

External links
Ministry of Finance and Economic Planning
Ministry of Finance and Economic Planning at Ministries section of Ghana.gov.gh

Finance
Ghana